This is a list of rulers of Martaban (Mottama), one of the three main Mon-speaking provinces of Lower Burma, from the 13th to 17th centuries. Martaban was the capital of Hanthawaddy Kingdom (Ramanya) from 1287 to 1364.

Pagan Period
The earliest extant evidence of Martaban on records is an 1176 inscription by King Sithu II of Pagan (Bagan).

Hanthawaddy Period

Toungoo Period

See also
 Hanthawaddy Kingdom
 List of Burmese monarchs
 List of rulers of Pegu
 List of rulers of Bassein

Notes

References

Bibliography
 
 
 
 
 

Martaban
Hanthawaddy dynasty